is a town located on Rishiri Island in Sōya Subprefecture, Hokkaido, Japan.

As of September 2016, the town has an estimated population of 2,169 and a density of 28 persons per km2. The total area is 76.49 km2.

Rishiri Airport is located in nearby Rishirifuji.

Geography
Rishiri is located on the western portion of Rishiri Island, facing the Sea of Japan. Mount Rishiri (also known as Rishirifuji), at 1721m, is located on the border with Rishirifuji.

Neighbouring municipalities
Sōya Subprefecture, Hokkaido
Rishirifuji

Climate

Demographics
Per Japanese census data, the population of Rishiri has declined in recent decades.

Education
Primary schools
Kutsugata Elementary School
Senhōshi Elementary School
Shinminato Elementary School
Junior high schools
Kutsugata Junior High School
Senhōshi Junior High School
High schools
Rishiri High School

Mascot

Rishiri's mascotis . She is a bright and energetic kelp with a Mount Rishiri motif. She helps Lip-kun and Lip-chan (the mascots of Rishirifuji) and Atsumon (the mascot of Rebun) research nature of Rishiri-Rebun-Sarobetsu National Park. Her favourite foods are sea urchins and kelp. She is unveiled in 2011.

References

External links

Official Website 

Towns in Hokkaido